Alexander Yuryevich Loginov (born 18 February 1987) is a Russian professional ice hockey defenceman currently playing for SC Csíkszereda of the Erste Liga.

He previously joined HC Sibir Novosibirsk of the Kontinental Hockey League (KHL) as a free agent on a two-year contract following his second stint with original club, Salavat Yulaev Ufa, on May 2, 2018.

References

External links

1987 births
Living people
Amur Khabarovsk players
Avtomobilist Yekaterinburg players
HC Karlovy Vary players
HC Neftekhimik Nizhnekamsk players
Russian ice hockey defencemen
Salavat Yulaev Ufa players
HC Sibir Novosibirsk players
Toros Neftekamsk players
Torpedo Nizhny Novgorod players
Sportspeople from Ufa
Russian expatriate ice hockey people
Russian expatriate sportspeople in the Czech Republic
Russian expatriate sportspeople in Romania
Expatriate ice hockey players in Romania
Expatriate ice hockey players in the Czech Republic